Hugh Auchincloss Steers (June 12, 1962 – March 1, 1995) was an American painter whose work is in the Whitney Museum of American Art, the Walker Art Center, and the Denver Art Museum. He died of AIDS at the age of 32.

Early life
Steers was born on June 12, 1962, to Nina Gore Auchincloss and Newton Steers. He was the second of three children born to his parents. Steers had two brothers, Ivan Steers the oldest and Burr Steers, the youngest,  the filmmaker. He attended the Hotchkiss School in Lakeville, Connecticut and graduated from Yale University in 1985. He later attended Skowhegan School of Painting and Sculpture in Maine, graduating in 1991.

Steers was the grandson of Hugh D. Auchincloss and Nina Gore and the great-grandson of Thomas Gore. His mother was the half-sister of writer Gore Vidal and a stepsister of Jacqueline Kennedy Onassis. In 1974, his parents divorced and later that same year, his mother married her second husband, Michael Straight. The wedding was attended by Hugh D. Auchincloss, Janet Auchincloss, Jackie Kennedy, Renata Adler, Beatrice Straight, and Peter Cookson.

Art
In 1989, Steers received a Pollock-Krasner Foundation Fellowship and had his first solo exhibition. He went on to exhibit his work in over 30 shows across the United States and Italy.

Steers' work, primarily figurative painting, is featured in the Whitney Museum of American Art, the Walker Art Center, and the Denver Art Museum. He painted in a style that mixed dreamlike allegory with Expressionist-tinged realism and incorporated art history references. In the 1990s, his work increasingly dealt with AIDS and many of his paintings showed male figures alone nearly nude or clothed in women's attire. Steers also depicted pairs of men bathing, dressing each other, and embracing. In his final works, he painted a self-portrait of a man dressed in a white hospital gown with white high heels. The figure is shown entering the lives of other characters as both an avenging and a guardian angel.

A comprehensive monographic catalogue of Steers’ work was published by Visual AIDS in 2015.

Personal life
Steers was openly gay and died of AIDS related complications in 1995 at the age of 32.

Exhibitions
Drawing Center, New York (1987)
Albright-Knox Gallery, Buffalo, NY (1988)
Denver Art Museum, Denver, Colorado (1991)
Midtown Galleries, New York (1992)
Richard Anderson, New York (1992)
New Museum of Contemporary Art (1994)
Cadmus, Steers, Warhol (2012)
Art Basel Miami Beach (2012)
Art Kabinett Art Basel Miami Beach History, Painting (2012)
Hugh Steers, Alexander Gray Associates (2013)
Hugh Steers, Whitney Museum of American Art (2013)
Art AIDS America, Tacoma Art Museum (2015)
Hugh Steers' Day Light Alexander Gray Associates (2015)
Hugh Steers' Strange State of Being Alexander Gray Associates (2021)

See also
Newton Steers
Burr Steers
Hugh D. Auchincloss
Thomas Gore

References

1962 births
1995 deaths
Painters from New York City
Artists from Washington, D.C.
Yale University alumni
20th-century American painters
American male painters
AIDS-related deaths in New York (state)
American gay artists
Auchincloss family
Skowhegan School of Painting and Sculpture alumni